Kankabatir Ghat is a 1955 Bengali film directed by Chitta Bose and produced by Harendranath Chattopadhyay. This film was written by Nripendrakrishna Chatterjee. This film was produced by Angel Digital Private Limited and distributed by Chitra Paribeshak. The music has been composed by Kalipada Sen. This is a drama film. The film stars Panchanan Bhattacharya, Ahindra Choudhury, Chandrabati Devi, Anubha Gupta, Anup Kumar, Shyam Laha, Kamal Mitra and Uttam Kumar in the lead roles.

Cast
 Rishi Banerjee
 Panchanan Bhattacharya
 Santi Bhattacharya
 Uttam Kumar
 Sibkali Chatterjee
 Ahindra Choudhury
 Panchanan Bhattacharya
 Asha Devi
 Belarani Devi
 Chandrabati Devi
 Anubha Gupta
 Anup Kumar
 Shyam Laha
 Preeti Majumdar
 Kamal Mitra
 Sandhya Rani
 Santosh Singha

Soundtrack

References

External links
 

Bengali-language Indian films
1955 films
1950s Bengali-language films
Indian black-and-white films
Indian drama films
1955 drama films